In enzymology, a gentamicin 3'-N-acetyltransferase is an enzyme that catalyzes the chemical reaction

acetyl-CoA + gentamicin C  CoA + N3'-acetylgentamicin C

Thus, the two substrates of this enzyme are acetyl-CoA and gentamicin C, whereas its two products are CoA and N3'-acetylgentamicin C.

This enzyme belongs to the family of transferases, specifically those acyltransferases transferring groups other than aminoacyl groups.  The systematic name of this enzyme class is acetyl-CoA:gentamicin-C N3'-acetyltransferase. Other names in common use include gentamicin acetyltransferase I, aminoglycoside acetyltransferase AAC(3)-1, gentamicin 3'-N-acetyltransferase, and acetyl-CoA:gentamicin-C N3'-acetyltransferase.

References

 
 
 

EC 2.3.1
Enzymes of unknown structure